Timeless Festival was a community music festival in Huddersfield, Kirklees, which ran from 2002 to 2005, "Pick of the Week" in The Guardian for the latter two. It was organised by Chocolate Fireguard Records  and the Timeless Music Project, and featured three stages in Ravensknowle Park, Wakefield Road, Huddersfield.

Acts included DJ Vadim, Lo Fidelity Allstars, Fat City Records Sound System, Oneself, Zion Train, Kava Kava, Root Jackson, The Freestylers, Fingathing, Transglobal Underground, The Bays, Panjabi Hit Squad, La Cedille, Snowboy and the Latin Section, Iration Steppas, Jehst, Asaviour, DJ IQ, Four Day Hombre, The Voltaires, The Selecter, Pee Wee Ellis, Dub Dadda and others.

External links
timelessfestival myspace
chocolatefireguard.com
timelessfestival.com

Music festivals in West Yorkshire
Music festivals established in 2002
2002 establishments in England
Recurring events disestablished in 2005
Huddersfield
2005 disestablishments in England